Ice jams occur when a topographic feature of the river causes floating river ice to accumulate and impede further progress downstream with the river current. Ice jams can significantly reduce the flow of a river and cause upstream flooding—sometimes called ice dams.  Ice jam flooding can also occur downstream when the jam releases in an outburst flood. In either case, flooding can cause damage to structures on shore.

Overview

An ice blockage on a river is usually called an ice jam, but sometimes an ice dam. An ice jam is an obstruction on a river formed by blocks of ice. Defined by the International Association of Hydraulic Research (IAHR) Working Group on River Ice Hydraulics an ice jam is a "stationary accumulation of fragmented ice or frazil that restricts flow" on a river or stream. The jam may effectively create a dam with an accumulation of anchor ice on the bottom of the river.  On rivers the obstruction may be a change of width, structure, bend or decrease in gradient. 

Ice jam floods are less predictable and potentially more destructive than open-water flooding and can produce much deeper and faster flooding. Ice jam floods also may occur during freezing weather, and may leave large pieces of ice behind, but they are much more localized than open-water floods. Ice jams also damage an economy by causing river-side industrial facilities such as hydro-electric generating stations to shut down and to interfere with ship transport. The United States averages 125 million dollars in losses to ice jams per year.

Mechanisms

Ice jams on rivers usually occur in the springtime as the river ice begins to break up, but may also occur in early winter during freeze-up. The break-up process is described in three phases: pre-break-up, break-up and final drive. Pre-break-up usually begins with increased springtime river flow, water level, and temperatures fracturing the river ice and separating it from the shore. Changes in river height from dam releases may also affect the pre-break-up. During the break-up, the ice in areas of rapids is carried downstream as an ice floe and may jam on still frozen sections of ice on calm water or against structures in the river such as the Honeymoon Bridge, destroyed in 1938 by an ice jam. Smaller jams may dislodge, flow downstream and form a larger jam. During the final drive, a large jam will dislodge and take out the remaining jams, clearing the river of ice in a matter of hours. Ice jams usually occur in spring, but they can happen as winter sets in when the downstream part becomes frozen first. Freeze-up jams may be larger because the ice is stronger and temperatures are continuing to cool unlike a spring break-up when the environment is warming, but are less likely to suddenly release water.

Three types of natural ice jams can occur:
 a surface jam, a single layer of ice in a floe on calm water;
 a narrow-channel or wide-channel jam; and
 a hanging jam, the accumulation of river ice at slow current areas which only occur during freeze-up.

Ice jams also occur at sharp bends in the river, at human-constructed objects such as bridge piers, and at confluences.

Occurrences and consequences

In the northern hemisphere, northerly flowing rivers tend to have more ice jams because the upper, more southerly reaches thaw first and the ice gets carried downstream into the still-frozen northerly part. There are three physical hazards of ice jams. The ice floe can form a dam that floods the areas upstream of the jam.  This occurred during the 2009 Red River Flood and the 2009 Alaska floods. The second type of hazard occurs as the ice jam breaks apart, and a sudden surge of water breaks through flooding areas downstream of the jam . Such a surge occurred on the St. Lawrence River in 1848.   The third hazard is that the ice buildup and final drive may damage structures in or near the river and boats in the river.

Ice jams may scour the river bed, causing damage or benefit to wildlife habitats and possibly damage to structures in the river.

Prediction and mitigation

Early warnings of an ice jam include using trained observers to monitor break-up conditions and ice motion detectors.

The prevention of ice jams may be accomplished by
 weakening the ice before the break-up by cutting or drilling holes in the ice;
 weakening the ice by dusting it with a dark colored sand; or
 controlling the timing of the break-up using ice breakers, towboats, hovercraft, or amphibious excavators. However, the movement of migratory fish is known to be related to freeze-up and break-up, so affecting ice break-up may affect fish migration.

Where floods threaten human habitation, the blockage may be artificially cleared.  Ice blasting using dynamite may be used, except in urban areas, as well as other mechanical means such as excavation equipment, or permanent measures such as ice control structures and flood control. Occasionally, military aircraft have been used to bomb ice jams with limited success as part of an effort to clear them.

See also
Drift ice
Fast ice
Ice shove
Jamming (physics)
Pressure ridge (ice)

References

External links

 United States National Park Service
 More images
 CRREL's Ice Jam Database

Dam
Glaciology
Flood
Weather hazards
Dams by type